Paulo da Gama (ca. 1465 in Olivença, Kingdom of Portugal – June or July 1499 at Angra do Heroísmo, Kingdom of Portugal) was a Portuguese explorer, son of Estêvão da Gama and Isabel Sodré, and the older brother of Vasco da Gama.

He was a member of the first voyage from Europe to India, led by his brother, commanding the ship São Rafael, which would be later scuttled in the return trip. Paulo da Gama joined  the São Gabriel. His brother brought him to the Terceira Island of the Azores and stayed with him until his death, before he returned to Portugal in September 1499. Paulo da Gama is buried in the monastery of São Francisco in the city of Angra do Heroísmo.

References

1460s births
1499 deaths
Portuguese explorers
Maritime history of Portugal
Explorers of Asia
Explorers of India
15th-century explorers
Year of birth uncertain
People from Olivenza
15th-century Portuguese people
Paulo